John Roche (also known as John Neele or Neale) was a Catholic martyr, born in Ireland, who died in London, England on 30 August 1588.

Life
He helped Margaret Ward arrange the escape of Richard Watson from Bridewell Prison when the boatman she had originally asked to help her refused to do so. Roche exchanged clothes with the prisoner and was arrested in his place. Offered his freedom if he would ask Queen Elizabeth I's pardon and promise to attend a Protestant church, he refused, and was hanged at Tyburn, London on 30 August 1588, along with Ward, Edward Shelley, Richard Martin, and Richard Leigh and Richard Lloyd (alias Flower).

Veneration
Pope Pius XI beatified Roche in 1929. A school in the London Borough of Tower Hamlets was named after him.

Iconography
Usually shown in working-class Elizabethan dress and holding an oar or a miniature boat, he is the patron of sailors, mariners and boatmen.

References

Sources
Patron Saints Index: Blessed John Roche

Year of birth missing
16th-century English people
1588 deaths
Irish beatified people
British people of Irish descent
16th-century Roman Catholic martyrs
16th-century venerated Christians
One Hundred and Seven Martyrs of England and Wales
24 Irish Catholic Martyrs